Harvinder Pal Singh Sibia (born 18 May 1953) is a Kenyan field hockey player. He competed in the men's tournament at the 1972 Summer Olympics.

References

External links
 

1953 births
Living people
Kenyan male field hockey players
Olympic field hockey players of Kenya
Field hockey players at the 1972 Summer Olympics
Sportspeople from Nairobi
Kenyan people of Indian descent
Kenyan people of Punjabi descent